Anthony Francis Bartholomay (1919–1975) was a mathematician who introduced molecular set theory, a topic on which he wrote books.

Life
Bartholomay was born on August 11, 1919. He would receive degrees from Hamilton College, Syracuse University, and Harvard University. Bartholomay would work at Harvard Medical School, Medical School of Ohio, Brown University, Keuka College, Rensselaer Polytechnic Institute, and Rutgers University. He died on March 21, 1975, at 55 years old. A resident of the Somerset section of Franklin Township, Somerset County, New Jersey, he died at a New Brunswick, New Jersey hospital from a stroke he had three weeks prior to his death.

Molecular set theory
Molecular set theory (MST) is a mathematical formulation of the wide-sense chemical kinetics of biomolecular reactions in terms of sets of molecules and their chemical transformations represented by set-theoretical mappings between molecular sets.

Career
He was a professor and chairmen of the Department of Mathematical Medicine at the Medical College of Ohio. He was only part of the Department of Mathematical Medicine from 1969 until 1972 when he left. The department subsequently collapsed the following year.

Howard Hughes Medical Institute website had Anthony Bartholomay listed as an investigator but was hosted at Harvard Medical School in 1957.

See also
 Mathematical biology

References

External links
Howard Hughes Medical Institute 
Fulton Newspaper Article

1919 births
1975 deaths
20th-century American mathematicians
People from Franklin Township, Somerset County, New Jersey
Harvard Medical School staff
Hamilton College (New York) alumni
Syracuse University alumni
Harvard University alumni
University of Toledo faculty
Rensselaer Polytechnic Institute faculty
Brown University faculty
Rutgers University faculty